Andrew Mark Heaney (born June 5, 1991) is an American professional baseball pitcher for the Texas Rangers of Major League Baseball (MLB). He has previously played in the MLB for the Miami Marlins, Los Angeles Angels, New York Yankees and Los Angeles Dodgers. Prior to becoming a professional, he played college baseball for the Oklahoma State Cowboys.

The Marlins drafted Heaney in the first round of the 2012 MLB draft. He made his MLB debut with the Marlins in 2014. Heaney pitched for the Angels from 2015 through 2021, and played for the Yankees in 2021 and Dodgers in 2022.

Amateur career
Heaney attended Putnam City High School in Warr Acres, Oklahoma, where he played for the school's baseball team. He was selected by the Tampa Bay Rays in the 24th round of the 2009 Major League Baseball Draft, but did not sign, opting to enroll at Oklahoma State University, where he played college baseball for the Oklahoma State Cowboys, competing in the Big 12 Conference of the National Collegiate Athletic Association's (NCAA) Division I. In the summer of 2011, he pitched in collegiate summer baseball for the Falmouth Commodores of the Cape Cod Baseball League.

In 2012, Heaney's junior season, he pitched to an 8–2 win–loss record and a 1.60 earned run average (ERA) in  innings pitched. He led all NCAA pitchers with 140 strikeouts. Heaney was named Big 12 Conference Baseball Pitcher of the Year in 2012.  Heaney was a unanimous All-America selection, being named a first-team All-American by Baseball America, Collegiate Baseball, the American Baseball Coaches Association, and the National Collegiate Baseball Writers Association.

Professional career

Miami Marlins
The Miami Marlins drafted Heaney in the first round of the 2012 Major League Baseball draft. Heaney was the ninth overall selection and received an estimated $2.6 million signing bonus.

Heaney began the 2013 season with the Jupiter Hammerheads of the Class A-Advanced Florida State League, and was promoted to the Jacksonville Suns of the Class AA Southern League in August. Between Jupiter and Jacksonville, he amassed a 34 inning scoreless streak. Heaney began the 2014 season with Jacksonville, and was promoted to the New Orleans Zephyrs of the Class AAA Pacific Coast League in May. In his Class AAA debut, he faced the Oklahoma City Redhawks and went five innings, allowing one run on seven hits while adding seven strikeouts and no walks. He took a no decision.

Heaney made his Major League debut on June 19, 2014, against the New York Mets. In his debut, Heaney went six innings and allowed one run while striking out three batters. He took the loss in a 1–0 game.

Los Angeles Angels
On December 10, 2014, the Marlins traded Heaney to the Los Angeles Dodgers, along with Chris Hatcher, Austin Barnes, and Enrique Hernández, in exchange for Dan Haren, Dee Gordon, and Miguel Rojas. Five hours later, he was traded to the Los Angeles Angels, in exchange for Howie Kendrick. Heaney thanked the Dodgers for their short time together, tweeting, "Well, @Dodgers we had a good run! Great to be a part of such a storied franchise. #thanksforthememories".

After some injuries to the starting rotation, Heaney was called up and made 18 starts for the Angels. He went 6–4 in 105 innings while displaying an excellent strikeout to walk ratio of 2.79 for Anaheim.

In 2016, Heaney made the Angels opening day rotation as their #2 starter. In what turned out to be his only start, after allowing 4 runs in 6 innings, Heaney left the game. After the game, Heaney felt discomfort in his elbow, he was immediately placed on the disabled list. On April 30, Heaney received a platelet rich plasma injection in his left elbow, sidelining him for 6 weeks. On June 28, Heaney underwent evaluations on his elbow and found no improvement, pushing back his return even further. On July 1, Heaney underwent Tommy John surgery and missed the remainder of the 2016 season. Heaney would finish his 2016 season with an ERA of 6.00 in six innings. In 2017, in 21.2 innings he was 1–2 with a 7.06 ERA.

On June 5, 2018, the day of his 27th birthday, Heaney pitched a one-hit complete game shutout as the Angels won 1–0 over the Kansas City Royals. Heaney was the only Angels starter to start 30 games in 2018. He finished the 2018 season 9–10 with an ERA of 4.15 and 180 strikeouts in 180 innings.

Heaney entered 2019 as the projected #1 starter but suffered an elbow inflammation and was shut down after his first spring start. He was shut down again on March 28 after experiencing a setback during a side session.

On July 6, 2019, Heaney became the first pitcher to start after the passing of fellow left-hander Tyler Skaggs. His first pitch against George Springer of Houston Astros was mimicking an overhand and slow curveball, which was Skaggs' best pitch, and was unchallenged with no swing. In 18 starts, Heaney was 4–6 with a 4.91 ERA.

Heaney was named the Angels' opening day starter for the 2020 season. In the 3–7 no-decision loss to the Oakland Athletics, Heaney pitched  innings, striking out 6 batters and allowing 1 run. He finished the shortened season with a record of 4–3 in 12 starts. He struck out 70 batters in  innings.

New York Yankees
On July 30, 2021, Heaney was traded to the New York Yankees in exchange for Janson Junk and Elvis Peguero. On August 12, Heaney was the starting pitcher in the first Field of Dreams game in Dyersville, Iowa against the Chicago White Sox. Heaney went 5 innings giving up 5 hits, 7 runs, 3 walks, and 3 home runs while striking out 5 batters as the Yankees lost 9–8. Prior to the 2021 American League Wild Card Game, Heaney was designated for assignment.
On October 8, Heaney rejected his outright assignment and elected free agency.

Los Angeles Dodgers
On November 10, 2021, Heaney signed a one-year, $8.5 million contract with the Los Angeles Dodgers. He made 14 starts and two relief appearances for the Dodgers in 2022, with a 4–4 record and 3.10 ERA while striking out 110 batters.
He also had a couple of lengthy stints on the injured list.

Texas Rangers
On December 9, 2022, Heaney signed a two-year contract with the Texas Rangers.

Pitching style
Heaney is an overhand pitcher with a long stride. In 2022 with the Los Angeles Dodgers, Heaney added a "sweeping" style slider to his repertoire.

Personal life
Heaney and his wife, Jordan, met in high school and married in 2014. In 2019, they implemented a dog therapy program at Children's Hospital of Orange County.

See also

 2012 College Baseball All-America Team

Notes

References

External links

1991 births
Living people
Baseball players from Oklahoma
Sportspeople from Oklahoma City
Major League Baseball pitchers
Miami Marlins players
Los Angeles Angels players
New York Yankees players
Los Angeles Dodgers players
Oklahoma State Cowboys baseball players
Gulf Coast Marlins players
Greensboro Grasshoppers players
Jupiter Hammerheads players
Jacksonville Suns players
New Orleans Zephyrs players
Glendale Desert Dogs players
Salt Lake Bees players
All-American college baseball players
Falmouth Commodores players
Oklahoma City Dodgers players
Tulsa Drillers players
Rancho Cucamonga Quakes players
Arizona Complex League Dodgers players